HyppSports is an in-house IPTV network in Malaysia dedicated to broadcasting sports-related content 24 hours a day. It is available exclusively on unifi TV via Channel 701 (HD) to subscribers of either stand-alone channel pack, Ultimate Pack, or any of the ethnic-curated packs (Aneka Plus, Ruby Plus, Varnam Plus).

Launched in 2012 as one of unifi TV original channels, HyppSports Illustrated 1 (a joint-venture between unifi TV and Sports Illustrated Asia) offers a sports of international sporting events such as football, badminton, motorsport, rugby, volleyball and golf. unifi TV also operates two sister channels, HyppSports Illustrated 2 and HyppSports 3 on Channels 702 & 703 respectively, along with a high definition simulcast of all channels.

HyppSports 2 

HyppSports Illustrated 2 is the first sister channel of HyppSports Illustrated 1. Launched on 15 November 2012, it is broadcast on unifi TV via Channel 702 in high-definition. Sporting events that are aired on this network include the American competitions like NFL and NHL and the Mexican competitions like Copa MX. On 1 August 2018, the channel, along with HyppSports 1 HD will be off-aired on unifi TV due to declining popularity of viewers.

HyppSports 3

HyppSports 3 is the second sister channel of HyppSports. Launched in 2012, it is broadcast on Channel 703 in high-definition. This channel is the home of Bundesliga, International Champions Cup, with exclusive and extensive live coverage of football matches and behind-the-scenes feature curated for fans.

HyppSports 4

HyppSports 4 was the third sister channel of HyppSports. Launched in 2012, it was broadcast on HyppTV Channel 704 in HD. This channel service ended on 1 July 2017.

On 2 February 2018, a joint-venture has been made between unifi TV and Football Malaysia LLP to bring HyppSports Plus – unifi Malaysia Super League HD channel, where it is dedicated to the live football matches of the 2018 Malaysia League. The channel then replace the defunct HyppSports 4 HD on Channel 704 for a limited time only. Selected live matches are also available for telecast on HyppSports 3 HD (Channel 703).

Sister Names
 Dunia Sinema HD
 HyppInspirasi HD
HyppSensasi HD
 Pesona HD
 Salam HD

Broadcast platform
Malaysia: unifi TV

External links

Sports television in Malaysia
Astro Malaysia Holdings television channels
Television channels and stations established in 2012 
Television channels and stations disestablished in 2018